Carlos Cornelius Rogers (born July 2, 1981) is a former American football cornerback. He played college football at Auburn, where he earned consensus All-American honors, and was drafted by the Washington Redskins ninth overall in the 2005 NFL Draft. Rogers has also played for the San Francisco 49ers and Oakland Raiders.

Early life
Rogers was born in Augusta, Georgia.  He was raised in Thomson, Georgia until his family moved to Augusta while he was in middle school.  He attended Butler High School, where he played football, basketball, and participated in track and field.  In football, Rogers played both offense and defense.  As a senior, he rushed for 1,332 yards and 11 touchdowns and posted 47 tackles with two interceptions.  He was a SuperPrep All-American, an Augusta Chronicle all-area and all-metro choice, and was listed in The Atlanta Journal-Constitution's "Georgia 75".  In basketball, he averaged 14.2 points per game as a senior and 13.8 points as a junior.  In track, he posted times of 10.7 seconds in the 100-meter dash and 21.0 seconds in the 200-meter dash.

College career
Rogers attended Auburn University, where he played for coach Tommy Tuberville's Auburn Tigers football team from 2001 to 2004.  He started 44 games over four years, and finished his career with 182 tackles (134 individual), seven interceptions, and two fumble recoveries.  He holds Auburn’s career record with forty pass deflections, which ranks second in SEC history.  He was named to the Auburn football All-Decade Team for the 2000s.

Rogers graduated with a bachelor's degree in sociology.

Freshman year (2001)
As a freshman, Rogers started 10 of 12 games and finished the season with 58 tackles (46 individual), one fumble recovery, and 12 pass deflections.  On October 6 , he recorded a career-high ten tackles, as well as two pass deflections, in a win over Mississippi State University. Auburn was selected to play in the 2001 Peach Bowl after the regular season, where they lost 16-10 against the University of North Carolina. In the game, he recorded six tackles.  Rogers was chosen as a Freshman All-American by The Sporting News, as well as an All-SEC Freshman choice.

Sophomore year (2002)
In 2002, Rogers started 9 of 13 games and recorded 48 tackles (34 individual), four interceptions, and nine pass deflections as a sophomore.  In a win over Syracuse University on September 8, he recorded two interceptions and returned one for 35 yards.  He did not make much of an impact in a Capital One Bowl win over Penn State University, where he deflected one pass and made no tackles.

Junior year (2003)
As a junior, Rogers started and played in 12 games.  In the win over the University of Tennessee on October 4, he had an interception and four tackles before he fractured his left thumb.  He sat out against the University of Arkansas the following week, underwent surgery in late October, and then played in several games with a cast.  After the regular season, Auburn was invited to the 2003 Music City Bowl, where they would beat the University of Wisconsin 28-14.  In the game, Rogers recorded three tackles and four pass deflections.  He finished the season with 29 tackles (17 individual) with nine pass deflections and an interception.

Senior year (2004)
During his senior season, Rogers started every game and helped lead Auburn to 13–0 undefeated season.  He finished with 47 tackles (37 individual), two interceptions, ten pass deflections, half a sack, and five tackles for loss in his final season.  Rogers, who was Auburn's first Jim Thorpe Award winner—given annually to the best defensive back in the country—earned consensus All-America honors and was one of five finalists for the Bronco Nagurski Award and a semifinalist for the Chuck Bednarik Award, each given to the best defensive college football player in the United States.

Professional career

2005 NFL Draft

Washington Redskins
Rogers was drafted by the Washington Redskins with the ninth overall pick in the first round of the 2005 NFL Draft.  The Redskins then acquired a second first-round pick from the Denver Broncos in exchange for Washington's third-round pick in 2005, as well as their first pick in 2006 and a fourth round pick in 2006.  They used this second first-round pick to draft Rogers' Auburn teammate, quarterback Jason Campbell, with the 25th overall pick.  On August 2, 2005, Rogers agreed to a five-year contract worth a maximum of $17.45 million over the life of the contract with $11.23 million in bonuses.

2005 season
After an ankle injury forced him to miss the first preseason game, Rogers played in his first game on August 19, a preseason loss to the Cincinnati Bengals.  In the game, he intercepted a pass from Carson Palmer and returned the ball to Cincinnati's 25-yard line.  On the next play, Redskins quarterback Patrick Ramsey threw a touchdown pass to James Thrash.  Rogers made his first NFL regular season start on October 2, in an overtime win against the Seattle Seahawks during which he had seven tackles (five individual) and one forced fumble.  In an overtime loss to the San Diego Chargers on November 27, he recorded his first NFL interception off of Drew Brees.  He also had a team-high eight tackles (seven individual) and three pass deflections.  The following week in a win against the St. Louis Rams, Rogers intercepted Ryan Fitzpatrick and had six tackles.

Rogers appeared in 12 regular season games and started five games.  He finished the season with 40 tackles (34 individual), two interceptions, four pass deflections, and two forced fumbles.  He also started the Redskins' two postseason games, in which he recorded 13 tackles and one pass deflection.

2006 season

Rogers started 15 games and recorded a career-high 88 tackles (71 individual), one interception, and 17 pass deflections.  He was inactive during the Indianapolis Colts loss on October 22, due to a fractured thumb.

2007 season
On October 7, Rogers recorded his first career interception return for a touchdown, when he intercepted a pass from Jon Kitna and returned it a career-best 61 yards in the 34-3 win over the Detroit Lions.  He started the first seven games of the season before he tore his ACL and MCL in a loss against the New England Patriots on October 28.  It was decided that surgery was the best option and he was placed on injured reserve on October 30.  Rogers recorded 30 tackles (23 individual), one interception, and eight pass deflections during this shortened season.

2008 season
Rogers returned from his knee injury from the previous season and started in the first game, a 16-7 loss to the New York Giants.  On September 21, he started the game vs. the Arizona Cardinals by jumping on an Edgerrin James fumble on the Cardinals 34 yard line in the first quarter which resulted in a Redskins field goal four plays later.  He later made a diving interception against Kurt Warner of the Arizona Cardinals in the fourth quarter.  Rogers then got to his feet, avoided a tackle by Larry Fitzgerald, and ran 42 yards to the 15-yard line.  Two plays later, Santana Moss caught a short pass from Jason Campbell and scooted in 17 yards for the score, giving the Redskins a 24-17 victory.  The following game was at Texas Stadium vs. the Dallas Cowboys.  Although Shawn Springs was assigned to cover the Cowboys #1 receiver, Terrell Owens, Springs became injured in the middle of the third quarter.  With a three-point lead and the game on the line, the responsibility of covering T.O. on short to intermediate routes fell to Rogers.  From that point forward, Rogers and the Washington defense held T.O. to two receptions on eight pass attempts, including three passes in a row from Tony Romo to T.O. into Rogers's coverage at the beginning of the 4th quarter - all incompletions.  Redskins won 26-24 and the game was chosen as the NFL Films Game of the Week.  Rogers acquired 7 tackles (6 solo) during the game, which was the high for the team that game and Rogers' high for the entire year.  Rogers played in all 16 regular season games for the first time in his career, with 14 starts.  He finished the season with 53 tackles (45 individual), two interceptions, 77 interception return yards, and one fumble recovery.

2009 season
Rogers played in 16 regular season games with 15 starts in 2009.  He recorded 46 tackles (34 individual), two fumble recoveries, and a team-high 12 pass deflections.  He helped the Redskins defense finish tenth in the league in overall defense and ninth in pass defense.

2010 season
Rogers played and started 12 games and recorded 54 combined tackles, 12 pass break-ups, two interceptions, and one forced fumble.

San Francisco 49ers

2011 season
On August 2, 2011, he signed a one-year contract with the San Francisco 49ers. He went on to lead the team with six interceptions that year and was named a starter on the NFC Pro Bowl roster as well as a Second-team All-Pro by the Associated Press.

2012 season
On March 14, 2012, Rogers re-signed with the team to a four-year, $31.3 million contract.

In the 2012 season, Rogers and the 49ers appeared in Super Bowl XLVII. In the game, he had three combined tackles as the 49ers fell to the Baltimore Ravens by a score of 34–31.

He was ranked 69th by his fellow players on  the NFL Network's Top 100 Players of 2012.

2013 season
Although Rodgers had a solid year with 47 combined tackles and 2 interceptions, the 49ers released Rogers on March 10, 2014, the eve of free agency, and thus allowing him to test the market.

Oakland Raiders

2014 season
On March 31, 2014, Rogers signed with the Oakland Raiders.

NFL career statistics

Healthcare fraud case
Rogers was charged with one count of conspiracy to commit wire fraud and health care fraud, two counts of wire fraud, and two counts of health care fraud by the United States Department of Justice on December 12, 2019. He initially pleaded not guilty to the charges, but later pled guilty in November 2020 to one count of conspiracy. By September 2021, Rogers was sentenced to 180 days of house arrest and ordered to perform 400 hours of community service.

References

External links
 Official Website 
 Oakland Raiders bio
 San Francisco bio
 Washington Redskins bio

1981 births
Living people
Players of American football from Augusta, Georgia
African-American players of American football
All-American college football players
American football cornerbacks
Auburn Tigers football players
Washington Redskins players
San Francisco 49ers players
Oakland Raiders players
21st-century African-American sportspeople
20th-century African-American people
National Conference Pro Bowl players